El Rati Horror Show is a 2010 Argentine film directed by Enrique Piñeyro and Pablo Tesoriere and written by Piñeyro and Pablo Galfre.

Plot 
The film focuses on the way in which the judicial cause of Fernando Carrera was hatched. It shows the alteration of the evidence at the crime scene, the manipulation by the police taking the testimony of the few witnesses called to testify and the handling of the national media by Ruben Maugeri.

External links 
 

2010 films
Argentine documentary films
2010s Spanish-language films
Argentine films based on actual events
2010s Argentine films